Loura may refer to:

 Mount Loura, northern Guinea
 Lou Yixiao (born 1988), Chinese actress and singer also known as Loura Lou
 Chhotu Loura, Indian boxer, bronze medalist at the 2006 Women's World Amateur Boxing Championships

See also
 Mark DeLoura (born 1969 or 1970), American video gaming advocate and an author
 Lura (disambiguation)
 Lööra, a village in Estonia